Ommal Aleppo Sports Club is a Syrian football club based in Aleppo. They play their home games at Aleppo 7 April Stadium. The sports club is part of the General Federation of Trade Unions.

References

Ommal Aleppo
Sport in Aleppo

External links
Official page